Events in the year 2012 in Cyprus.

Incumbents 

 President: Demetris Christofias
 President of the Parliament: Yiannakis Omirou

Events 
Ongoing – 2012–2013 Cypriot financial crisis; Cyprus dispute

January 
 13 January – The credit rating agency Standard & Poor's lowers its long-term credit ratings by two notches on multiple eurozone countries, including Cyprus, while lowering it by one notch for Austria, France, Malta, Slovakia, and Slovenia.

June 
 25 June – The country announces that it plans to ask its European partners for a loan of about 1.8 billion euros by the end of this week; this would make Cyprus the fifth European country to seek help.

July 
 25 July – Lamia al-Hariri, Syrian ambassador to Cyprus, and her husband Abdelatif al-Dabbagh, Syrian ambassador to the UAE, defect to Qatar.

Deaths

References 

 
2010s in Cyprus
Years of the 21st century in Cyprus
Cyprus
Cyprus
Cyprus